Kevin Hughes may refer to:

 Kevin Hughes (American football) (born 1988), American football player
 Kevin Hughes (Australian footballer) (born 1963), Australian football player
 Kevin Hughes (cricketer) (born 1966), former English cricketer
 Kevin Hughes (Gaelic footballer), All-Ireland-winning Tyrone Gaelic footballer
 Kevin Hughes (Internet pioneer), American World Wide Web pioneer
 Kevin Hughes (pole vaulter) (born 1973), British Olympic athlete
 Kevin Hughes (politician) (1952–2006), British Labour politician